Thomas Haigh Judson ( (c)1857 – 4 September 1908) was an English-born international rugby union player who played club rugby for Llanelli and international rugby for Wales. He later became a member of the first London Welsh team.

Rugby career
Judson won his first international cap when, as a member of the first class team Llanelli, he was selected to play in the inaugural Home Nations Championship against England. Under the captaincy of Charles Lewis, Judson was one of three Llanelli players in the Wales squad, the others being Alfred Cattell and Harry Bowen. Wales was competent, but unspectacular, and was out-classed by the Australian wing Charles Wade in a four tries and two goals to nil loss. Judson was reselected for his second and final international game, against Scotland, as part of the same Championship. This was the first meeting between the two nations, and was played at Raeburn Place in Edinburgh. Wales lost by three goals to one, but Judson scored the Welsh try, making him the first ever try scorer against Scotland for his country.

In 1885, Judson was living in London and on 24 June was present at meeting which saw the creation of Welsh exile club, London Welsh. Judson was elected club treasurer, and, on 25 October 1885, a London Welsh team faced London Scottish with Judson was amongst the Welsh forwards. Later that year, he was part of a joint London Welsh / London Scottish team that faced a London XV, in a charity match at The Oval to benefit the London poor. The match was watched by a crowd of 8,000 and among the spectators was the Prince of Wales.

International matches played
Wales (rugby union)
  1882
  1883

Bibliography

References 

1857 births
1908 deaths
English rugby union players
English schoolteachers
Llanelli RFC players
London Welsh RFC players
Rugby union forwards
Rugby union players from Ashton-under-Lyne
Wales international rugby union players